Meliosma youngii is a species of plant in the Sabiaceae family. It is endemic to Peru.

References

Flora of Peru
youngii
Vulnerable plants
Taxonomy articles created by Polbot